Arfa Sayeda Zehra is a Pakistani educationist and Urdu language expert. She studied first at Lahore College for Women University, then Government College University, with further degrees from the University of Hawaii at Manoa. Zehra is a professor emeritus of history at Forman Christian College and is a former principal of the Lahore College for Women University. She was a chairperson on the National Commission on the Status of Women. Zehra is a former caretaker provincial minister of Punjab. She is recognized for her knowledge on the Urdu language and literature and is specialized in intellectual history and South Asian social issues; outside of the university sphere, she speaks at language conferences and televised forums.

Education 
Arfa Sayeda Zehra completed a Bachelor of Arts with honors from Lahore College for Women University. She earned a Master of Arts in Urdu from Government College University in Lahore. She completed a Master of Arts in Asian studies and a Doctor of Philosophy in History from University of Hawaii at Manoa. Her 1983 dissertation was titled Sir Sayyid Ahmad Khan, 1817-1898: Man with a Mission.

Scholarly career 
From 1966 through 1972, Zehra was a lecturer at Lahore College for Women. She became an assistant professor in 1972 and taught until 1984. She served the Vice Principal of Lahore College for Women University from 1985 to 1988 before becoming the principal from 1988 to 1989. From 1989 to 2002 she was the Principal of the Government College of Women, Gulberg. From 2002 to 2005 she was a member of the Punjab Public Service Commission. Zehra was a chairperson on the National Commission on the Status of Women. Zehra is a former caretaker provincial minister of Punjab. She joined the faculty at Forman Christian College as a professor of history in August 2009. She was a visiting faculty member at the following institutions Lahore University of Management Sciences, the National College of Arts, National School of Public Policy, and National Institute of Management. Her research is in the areas of intellectual history, historical analysis and critique, human rights, and gender literature and social issues. She is a professor emeritus at Forman Christian College in Lahore.

Urdu language 
Zehra is recognized for her knowledge on Urdu language and literature. She advocates for continued use of the language, for access to books, and for a "literary revolution" of Pakistani youth for their national language. On the language itself, she has discussed the influences of classism and colonialism on the language's speakers and perceptions of the language itself. Her literary influences include Ghalib and Syed Ahmad Khan. She is lauded as a historian and moderates forums on the language.

Personal life 
Zehra is a development, basic human rights, and gender equality, although she states that has never been an official member of any non-governmental organization, instead choosing to work through education. She is chairperson of the National Commission on the Status of Women and moderated a on women's basic legal rights. Her work for female equity and parity was a factor leading to her choice to teach at a women's college.

Awards and honors 
Zehra was a University of Hawaii 2016 Distinguished Alumni Awardee.

References

Living people
Pakistani educators
Provincial ministers of Punjab
Women provincial ministers of Punjab
Urdu-language writers
Academic staff of the Forman Christian College
Academic staff of Lahore College for Women University
University of Hawaiʻi at Mānoa alumni
Lahore College for Women University alumni
Government College University, Lahore alumni
20th-century Pakistani women writers
21st-century Pakistani women writers
Pakistani human rights activists
Pakistani women's rights activists
Year of birth missing (living people)